Toshio Yamamoto may refer to:

Tosanoumi Toshio, (born 1972 as Toshio Yamamoto), sumo wrestler
Toshio Yamamoto (mountaineer), Japanese mountaineer